Euphrasia brevipila is a species of flowering plant belonging to the family Orobanchaceae.

Its native range is Europe and European Russia.

References

brevipila